The 1915 South Sydney Rabbitohs season was the 8th in the club's history. The club competed in the New South Wales Rugby Football League Premiership (NSWRFL), finishing the season 4th.

Ladder

Fixtures

Regular season

City Cup

References 

South Sydney Rabbitohs seasons
South Sydney season